Events from the year 1926 in the United States.

Incumbents

Federal Government 
 President: Calvin Coolidge (R-Massachusetts)
 Vice President: Charles G. Dawes (R-Illinois)
 Chief Justice: William Howard Taft (Ohio)
 Speaker of the House of Representatives: Nicholas Longworth (R-Ohio)
 Senate Majority Leader: Charles Curtis (R-Kansas)
 Congress: 69th

Events

January–March
 February 1 – Land on Broadway and Wall Street in New York City is sold at a record $7 per sq inch.
 March 16 – Robert Goddard launches the first liquid-fuel rocket, at Auburn, Massachusetts.

April–June
 April 12 – By a vote of 45–41, the United States Senate unseats Iowa Senator Smith W. Brookhart and seats Daniel F. Steck, after Brookhart has served for over one year.
 April 30 – African-American pilot Bessie Coleman is killed after falling  from an airplane.
 May 10 – Planes piloted by Major Harold Geiger and Horace Meek Hickam, students at the Air Corps Tactical School, collide in mid-air over Langley Field, Virginia. Hickam parachutes to safety.
 May 18 – Evangelist Aimee Semple McPherson disappears while visiting a beach at Venice, California; on June 23 she is found stumbling in the desert of Agua Prieta, Mexico just south of Douglas, Arizona, claiming she has been kidnapped, drugged, tortured and held for ransom, but has escaped.
 May 12 – The United States Congress passes the Air Commerce Act, licensing pilots and planes.
 June 19 – DeFord Bailey is the first African-American to perform on Nashville's Grand Ole Opry.
 June 23 – The College Board administers the first SAT, a major standardized test for university and college admission in the U.S.

July–September
 July 1 – Benjamin Franklin Bridge opens.
 July 12 – A lightning strike destroys an ammunition depot in Dover, New Jersey.
 July 26 – The National Bar Association incorporates in the United States.
 August 6 – In New York City, the Warner Brothers' Vitaphone system premieres with the movie Don Juan starring John Barrymore.
 August 18 – A weather map is televised for the first time, sent from NAA Arlington to the Weather Bureau Office in Washington, D.C.
 September 11 – Aloha Tower is officially dedicated at Honolulu Harbor in the Territory of Hawai'i.
 September 16 – Philip Dunning and George Abbott's play Broadway premieres in New York City.
 September 18 – Great Miami Hurricane: A strong hurricane devastates Miami, Florida, leaving over 100 dead and causing several hundred million dollars in damage (equal to nearly $100 billion today).
 September 20 – Twelve cars full of gangsters open fire at the Hawthorne Inn, Al Capone's Chicago headquarters. Only one of Capone's men is wounded.
 September 25 – The Detroit Cougars, a professional ice hockey club (National Hockey League) and predecessor of the Detroit Red Wings, is founded.

October–December
 October 10 – The St. Louis Cardinals defeat the New York Yankees, 4 games to 3, to win their first World Series Title. This World Series ended when Babe Ruth attempted to steal second base and is the only World Series to end this way.
 October 14 – Poland presents President Calvin Coolidge with a 111 volume gift called  a "Polish Declaration of Admiration and Friendship for the United States of America" comprising some 15,000 bound sheets with the signatures of an estimated 5,500,000 Polish citizens on the occasion of America's 150th anniversary of independence.
November 10 – In San Francisco, California, a necrophiliac serial killer named Earle Nelson (dubbed "Gorilla Man") kills and then rapes his 9th victim, a boardinghouse landlady named Mrs. William Edmonds.
 November 11 – The plan for a United States Numbered Highway System is approved by the American Association of State Highway Officials, so establishing U.S. Route 66.
 November 15 – The NBC radio network opens with 24 stations (formed by Westinghouse, General Electric and RCA).
 November 27 – In Williamsburg, Virginia, the restoration of Colonial Williamsburg begins.
 December 23 – Conservative Nicaraguan President Adolfo Díaz requests U.S. military assistance in the Nicaraguan civil war (1926–27). U.S. Marines immediately set up neutral zones in Puerto Cabezas and at the mouth of the Rio Grande to protect American and foreign lives and property.

Undated
 Microbiologist Selman Waksman publishes Enzymes.
 The Pike School in Andover, Massachusetts, is founded.
 Lundy's Restaurant is founded at Sheepshead Bay, Brooklyn.

Ongoing
 Lochner era (c. 1897–c. 1937)
 U.S. occupation of Haiti (1915–1934)
 Prohibition (1920–1933)
 Roaring Twenties (1920–1929)

Births

January

 January 2 
 Harold Bradley, American country music session guitarist (d. 2019)
 Howard Caine, American actor (d. 1993)
 January 5
 Hosea Williams, civil rights leader, activist, minister, businessman, philanthropist, scientist, and politician (d. 2000)
 W. D. Snodgrass, poet (d. 2009)
 January 6
 Ralph Branca, baseball player (d. 2016)
 Pat Flaherty, race car driver (d. 2002)
 January 8 
 Chester Feldman, television game show producer (d. 1997)
 Evelyn Lear, soprano (d. 2012)
 Soupy Sales, comedian (d. 2009)
 January 11 – Grant Tinker, television executive (d. 2016)
 January 12 – Ray Price, American country music singer and songwriter (d. 2013)
 January 14 – Tom Tryon, American actor, novelist (d. 1991)
 January 17 – Newton N. Minow, attorney 
 January 20 
 Patricia Neal, actress (d. 2010)
 David Tudor, American pianist, composer (d. 1996)  
 January 21
 Saul Mandel, illustrator, artist, animator and graphic designer (d. 2011)
 Steve Reeves, American actor (d. 2000)
 January 24 – Ruth Asawa, sculptor (d. 2013)
 January 29 – Bob Falkenburg, tennis player and entrepreneur (d. 2022)
 January 31 – Chuck Willis, singer and songwriter (d. 1958) (some sources give his year of birth as 1928)

February

 February 1 – Nancy Gates, American actress (d. 2019)
 February 3 – Richard Yates, novelist (d. 1992)
 February 7 – Bill Hoest, cartoonist (d. 1988)
 February 8 – Neal Cassady, American writer (d. 1968)
 February 10 – Mimi Sheraton, food critic
 February 12
 Charles Van Doren, American professor, subject of film Quiz Show (d. 2019)
 Joe Garagiola Sr., baseball player (d. 2016)
 February 13 – Bill Mercer, sportscaster 
 February 14 
 Al Brodax, film, television producer (d. 2016)
 Moneta Sleet Jr., press photographer (d. 1996)  
 February 17 
 Peter T. Flawn, geologist and educator (d. 2017)  
 Lee Hoiby, composer (d. 2011)
 February 18
 A. R. Ammons, poet and academic (d. 2001)
 Wallace Berman, painter and illustrator (d. 1976)
 Len Ford, American football player (d. 1972)
 February 20
 Whitney Blake, American actress (d. 2002)
 Richard Matheson, American author (d. 2013)
 Bob Richards, American track and field athlete (d. 2023)
 February 22 – Nelson Bunker Hunt, businessman (d. 2014)
 February 23 
 Lawrence Holofcener, sculptor, poet, lyricist, playwright, novelist, actor and director (d. 2017)
 Claire Shulman, American politician (d. 2020)  
 February 26
 Verne Gagne, American professional wrestler (d. 2015)
 Henry Molaison, American memory disorder patient (d. 2008)
 Doris Belack, American actress (d. 2011)

March

 March 1 – Pete Rozelle, National Football League commissioner (d. 1996)
 March 2 – Murray Rothbard, economist (d. 1995)
 March 3
 Craig Dixon, athlete (d. 2021)
 James Merrill, poet (d. 1995)
 March 4 
 DeVan Dallas, politician (d. 2016)
 Richard DeVos, billionaire, co-founder of Amway (d. 2018)
 Fran Warren, popular singer (d. 2013)
 March 5 – Joan Shawlee, actress (d. 1987)
 March 6 – Alan Greenspan, economist
 March 8 – Dick Teed, Major League Baseball player (d. 2014)
 March 9 – Joe Franklin, radio, television personality (d. 2015)
 March 11
 Ralph Abernathy, African-American civil rights leader (d. 1990)
 Thomas Starzl, American physician (d. 2017)
 March 12 – George Ariyoshi, American politician, lawyer 
 March 15
Ben Johnston, composer (d. 2019)
 Norm Van Brocklin, American football player (d. 1983)
 March 16
 Charles Goodell, politician (d. 1987)
 Jerry Lewis, comedian, humanitarian and philanthropist (d. 2017)
 Geraldine Weiss, trader (d. 2022)
 March 17 – Jaynne Bittner, baseball player (d. 2017) 
 March 20 – Marge Calhoun, surfer (d. 2017)
 March 25 – Gene Shalit, film and book critic and television personality 
 March 27 – Harry Connick Sr., attorney

April

 April 1
 Charles Bressler, operatic tenor and educator (d. 1996)
 Anne McCaffrey, American-born Irish author (d. 2011)
 April 3 
 Gus Grissom, American astronaut (d. 1967)
 R. W. Schambach, American televangelist, speaker and author (d. 2012)
 April 4 –  Addo Bonetti, politician and soldier (d. 2021)
 April 5 – Roger Corman, American filmmaker, producer, actor and businessman 
 April 6 – Randy Weston, American jazz pianist and composer (d. 2018)
 April 8 
 Sue Casey, American actress (d. 2019)
 Shecky Greene, actor 
 April 9
Hugh Hefner, American magazine editor, founder of Playboy (d. 2017)
 Harris Wofford, American politician, U.S. Senator from 1991 to 1995 (d. 2019)
 April 11 – David Manker Abshire, United States Army officer (d. 2014)
 April 12 – Jane Withers, American actress (d. 2021)
 April 15 – Walter Dee Huddleston, U.S. Senator from Kentucky from 1973 to 1985 (d. 2018)
 April 21 – Wayne E. Meyer, American Rear-Admiral (d. 2009)
 April 22 – Charlotte Rae, American actress, singer (d. 2018)
 April 23 – J. P. Donleavy, American novelist (d. 2017 in Ireland)
 April 24 –  Marilyn Erskine, actress  
 April 27 
 Alvin Baldus, American Democratic politician (d. 2017)
 Tim LaHaye, evangelist, speaker and author (d. 2016)
 April 28
 James Bama, American artist, illustrator 
 Greg Gates, American Olympic rower (d. 2020)
 Harper Lee, American novelist (d. 2016)
 April 29 
 Paul Baran, American internet pioneer (d. 2011)
 Carrie Meek, American politician and educator (d. 2021)
 April 30 – Cloris Leachman, American actress (d. 2021)

May

 May 5
 Ann B. Davis, American actress (d. 2014)
 Bing Russell, American actor (d. 2003)
 May 8 – Don Rickles, American stand-up comedian, actor (d. 2017)
 May 10 – Tichi Wilkerson Kassel, American film personality, publisher of The Hollywood Reporter (d. 2004)
 May 11 – Caesar Trunzo, U.S. soldier and politician (d. 2013)
 May 12 – Earl Dewitt Hutto, American politician (d. 2020)
 May 18 – Douglas Henry, American politician (d. 2017)
 May 19 – Mark Andrews, U.S. Senator from North Dakota from 1981 to 1987 (d. 2020)
 May 21 – Robert Creeley, American poet (d. 2005)
 May 23 – Aileen Hernandez, African American civil rights activist (d. 2017)
 May 25
 Claude Akins, American actor (d. 1994)
 Bill Sharman, American basketball player, coach (d. 2013)
 May 26 – Miles Davis, African-American jazz musician (d. 1991)
 May 30
 Tony Terran, trumpet player, session musician (d. 2017)
 Johnny Gimble, country musician, fiddler (d. 2015)

June

 June 1
 Andy Griffith, American actor (d. 2012)
 Marilyn Monroe, American actress and icon (d. 1962)
 Richard Schweiker, U.S. Senator from Pennsylvania from 1969 to 1981 (d. 2015)
 June 3
 Roscoe Bartlett, Republican member of the United States House of Representatives 
 Roxcy Bolton, feminist and civil and women's rights activist (d. 2017) 
 Allen Ginsberg, American poet (d. 1997)
 June 5 – Peter G. Peterson, American banker and businessman, American Secretary of Commerce (d. 2018) ***
 June 6 – Sholom Rivkin, American rabbi (d. 2011)
 June 9
 Georgia Holt, singer and actress (d. 2022)
 Happy Rockefeller, Second Lady of the United States as wife of Nelson A. Rockefeller (d. 2015)
 June 10 – June Haver, American actress and singer (d. 2005)
 June 11 – Carlisle Floyd, American composer (d. 2021)
 June 13 
 Paul Lynde, American actor and comedian (d. 1982)
 June Krauser, American swimmer (d. 2014)
 June 14 – Don Newcombe, American baseball player (d. 2019)
 June 16 – William F. Roemer, Jr., United States FBI agent (d. 1996)
 June 18 – Murray A. Straus,  American sociologist and professor (University of New Hampshire), creator of the Conflict tactics scale (d. 2016)
 June 19 
 Erna Schneider Hoover, mathematician and inventor 
 Arno Mayer, historian and writer
 June 21 – Fred Cone, former professional American football fullback 
 June 22
 George Englund, film editor, director, producer and actor (d. 2017)
 Ray Szmanda, radio and television announcer (d. 2018)
 June 24 
 Blackie Gejeian, race car driver, race car builder, and hot rod enthusiast (d. 2016)
 Barbara Scofield, tennis player
 June 27 
 Len Ceglarski, hockey player (d. 2017) 
 Don Raleigh, ice hockey player (d. 2012) 
 June 28
 Satoru Abe, American sculptor and painter
 George Booth, American cartoonist (d. 2022)
 Mel Brooks, American actor, comedian, and screenwriter
 June 29
 Roger Stuart Bacon, American politician 
 Bobby Morgan, baseball player

July

 July 1
 Fernando J. Corbató, American computer scientist (d. 2019)
 Robert Fogel, American economist, Nobel Prize laureate (d. 2013)
 July 3 – Rae Allen, actress, director, and singer (d. 2022)
 July 4 
 Mary Stuart, soap actress and musician (d. 2002)  
 Lake Underwood, race car driver and businessman (d. 2008)
 July 5
 Roy Hawes, American first baseman in Major League Baseball (d. 2017)
 Mario Picone. American pitcher (d. 2013)
 July 8 – John Dingell, American politician (d. 2019)
 July 10
 Carleton Carpenter, American actor and dancer
 Donald Geary, American ice hockey player (d. 2015)
 Fred Gwynne, American actor and author (d. 1993)
 Harry MacPherson, American pitcher (d. 2017)
 Tony Settember, American racing driver (d. 2014)
 July 11
 Frederick Buechner, American author and theologian
 Joe Houston, American saxophonist (d. 2015)
 July 12 – Abe Addams, American soccer player (d. 2017) 
 July 13
 T. Loren Christianson, American politician (d. 2019)  
 Thomas Clark, American politician (d. 2020)  
 July 14 
 Wallace Jones, basketball player (d. 2014) 
 Harry Dean Stanton, actor (d. 2017)
 July 16 
 Paul M. Ellwood Jr., physician (d. 2022)
 Irwin Rose, biologist, recipient of the Nobel Prize in Chemistry (d. 2015)
 July 17
 William Pierson, American television, motion picture and stage actor (d. 2004)
 Charles Zwick, American civil servant (d. 2018)
 July 18 – Nita Bieber, American actress (d. 2019) 
 July 19
 Helen Gallagher, American actress, dancer, and singer
 Robert E. Lavender, American Justice (d. 2020)
 July 23 – Johnny Groth, American baseball player and scout (d. 2021)
 July 27 – Marlow Cook, U.S. Senator from Kentucky from 1968 to 1974 (d. 2016)
 July 31 
 Bernard Nathanson, American medical doctor and activist (d. 2011)
 Hilary Putnam, American philosopher, mathematician and computer scientist (d. 2016)

August

 August 1 – Meg Randall, actress (d. 2018)
 August 2 – W. Carter Merbreier, television host (Captain Noah) (d. 2016) 
 August 3 – Tony Bennett, singer
 August 6
 Janet Asimov, American writer and psychiatrist (d. 2019)
 Norman Wexler, American screenwriter (d. 1999)
 August 7
 John Otho Marsh Jr., American politician, 14th United States Secretary of the Army (d. 2019)
 Stan Freberg, American author, recording artist and comedian (d. 2015)
 Bowen Stassforth, American swimmer (d. 2019)  
 August 9 – Frank M. Robinson, American science fiction and techno-thriller writer (d. 2014)
 August 11 – Ron Bontemps, American basketball player (d. 2017)
 August 12
 Douglas Croft, actor (d. 1963)
 John Derek, American actor and film director (d. 1998)
 Wallace Markfield, American writer (d. 2002)
 August 14 – Buddy Greco, American jazz and pop singer and pianist (d. 2017)
 August 21 – Carolyn Leigh, lyricist (d. 1983)
 August 22 – Lois Hall, American actress (d. 2006)
 August 26 – Robert Vickrey, American artist and author (d. 2011)
 August 27 – Albert H. Owens Jr., American oncologist (d. 2017)
 August 29 
 Don Doll, American football player and coach (d. 2010)
 Betty Lynn, American actress (d. 2021)

September

 September 1 – Stanley Cavell, American philosopher (d. 2018)
 September 3
 Joseph P. Kolter, American politician (d. 2019)
 Alison Lurie, American author and academic (d. 2020)
 September 4 – Robert J. Lagomarsino, American politician (d. 2021)
 September 6
 Maurice Prather, American photographer (d. 2001)
 Clancy Sigal, American writer (d. 2017)
 September 7
 Ronnie Gilbert, American folk singer and songwriter (d. 2015) 
 Don Messick, American voice actor (d. 1997)
 Donald Pinkel, American physician (d. 2022)
 September 9 – Charles Duncan Jr., American businessman and politician (d. 2022)
 September 14 
 Dick Dale, American singer and musician (d. 2014)
 John F. Kurtzke, American neurologist (d. 2015)
 September 16
 Tommy Bond, American actor (d. 2005).
 John Knowles, American author (d. 2001)
 Robert Schuller, American televangelist, motivational speaker and author (d. 2015)
 September 17 – Bill Black, American bass player and bandleader, a pioneer of rock and roll music (d. 1965)
 September 18
Joe Kubert, American author and illustrator, founded The Kubert School (d. 2012)
Bob Toski, American golfer
 September 19
 James Lipton, American television personality and writer (d. 2020)
 Duke Snider, American baseball player (d. 2011)
 September 21 – Donald A. Glaser, American physicist, Nobel Prize laureate (d. 2013)
 September 22 – Bill Smith, American clarinet player and composer (d. 2020)
 September 23 
 John Coltrane, African-American jazz saxophonist (d. 1967)
 Henry Silva, American actor (d. 2022)
 September 25 – Charles J. Colgan, American politician and businessman (d. 2017)
 September 26 – Julie London, American jazz and pop singer, screen actress and model (d. 2000)
 September 28 
 Ralph Ahn, American actor (d. 2022)
 Jerry Clower, American country comedian (d. 1998)
 September 29
 Chuck Cooper, basketball player (d. 1984) 
 Philip Ruppe, American politician 
 September 30 – Dave Hunt, American apologist, speaker, radio commentator and author (d. 2013)

October

 October 1 – Max Morath, American musician
 October 4 – Senaida Wirth, American female professional baseball player (d. 1967)
 October 10 – Richard Jaeckel, American actor (d. 1997)
 October 11 – Earle Hyman, American film and television actor (d. 2017)
 October 13 – Jesse L. Brown, first African-American aviator in the United States Navy (d. 1950)
 October 15
 Jeffrey Hayden, American television director and producer (d. 2016)
 Jean Peters, American actress (d. 2000)
 October 16 – Charles Dolan, American billionaire
 October 17
 Julie Adams, American actress (d. 2019)
 Beverly Garland, American actress and businesswoman (d. 2008)
 October 18
 Chuck Berry, African-American guitarist, singer and songwriter, a pioneer of rock and roll music (d. 2017)
 Pauline Pirok, American female professional baseball player (d. 2020)
 October 19 – Marjorie Tallchief, American ballerina 
 October 21 – Bob Rosburg, American golfer (d. 2009)
 October 25 
 Jimmy Heath, American saxophonist and composer (d. 2020)
 Biff McGuire, American actor (d. 2021)
 Walter Mengden, American attorney and politician (d. 2018)
 October 27 – H. R. Haldeman, 4th White House Chief of Staff (d. 1993)
 October 28 – Bowie Kuhn, American Commissioner of Baseball (d. 2007)

November

 November 1 – Betsy Palmer, American actress (d. 2015)
 November 2
 Myer Skoog, American basketball player (d. 2019)
 Charlie Walker, American country music singer-songwriter (d. 2008)
 November 4 
 Carmen A. Orechio, American politician (d. 2018)
 Laurence Rosenthal, composer
 November 8 
 Darleane C. Hoffman, American nuclear chemist
 Jack Mendelsohn, American writer-artist (d. 2017)
 November 9 – Stu Griffing, American Olympic rower
 November 13 – Harry Hughes, American politician (d. 2019)
 November 14 – Tom Hatten, American radio and television personality (d. 2019)
 November 16 – Amy Applegren, American professional baseball player (d. 2011)
 November 19 – Jeane Kirkpatrick, American ambassador (d. 2006)
 November 20 – Ann Turner Cook, American educator and writer  (d. 2022)
 November 23 – R. L. Burnside, American musician (d. 2005)
 November 25
 Jeffrey Hunter, American actor (d. 1969)
 Terry Kilburn, actor 
 Poul Anderson, science fiction author (d. 2001)
 November 30 – Richard Crenna, American actor (d. 2003)

December

 December 7 – William John McNaughton, American bishop (d. 2020) 
 December 8 – Ralph Puckett, army commander  
 December 9
Henry Way Kendall, American physicist, Nobel Prize laureate (d. 1999)
Lorenzo Wright, American track and field athlete (d. 1972)
 December 10 – Guitar Slim, American New Orleans blues guitarist (d. 1959)
 December 12 – Dorli Rainey, American political activist (d. 2022)
 December 16 – James McCracken, American tenor (d. 1988)
 December 17 – Patrice Wymore, American actress (d. 2014)
 December 19 – Herbert Stempel, American game show contestant (d. 2020)
 December 20 – David Levine, American artist and illustrator (d. 2009)
 December 21
 Elisabeth Elliot, Christian author and speaker (d. 2015)
 Joe Paterno, American football player and coach (d. 2012)
 December 23 – Robert Bly, poet
 December 26 – Champ Butler, singer (d. 1992)

Unknown
 Date unknown – David Johnson, photographer

Deaths
 January 26 – John Flannagan, Roman Catholic priest (born 1860)  
 January 30 – Barbara La Marr, silent film actress (born 1896)
 February 9 – Edith Julia Griswold, patent attorney (born 1863)
 February 21 – Charles Ellis Johnson, photographer (born 1857)
 March 2 – Victory Bateman, stage and silent screen actress (born 1865)
 March 11 – Maibelle Heikes Justice, novelist and screenwriter (born 1871)
 March 12 – E. W. Scripps, newspaper publisher (born 1854)
 March 16 – Sergeant Stubby, World War I hero war dog (born 1916)
 April 11 – Luther Burbank, botanist (born 1849)
 May 10 – Alton B. Parker, judge and political candidate (born 1852)
 May 26 – Frank Nelson Cole, mathematician (born 1861)
 July 10 – Sarah P. Monks, naturalist and educator (born 1841) 
 July 26 – Robert Todd Lincoln, statesman and businessman, son of Abraham Lincoln (born 1843)
 July 30 –
 Albert B. Cummins, U.S. Senator from Iowa from 1908 to 1926 (born 1850)
 Max Levy, American inventor and scientist (born 1857)
 October 20 – Eugene V. Debs, labor leader (born 1855)
 October 22 – John G. Shedd, businessman (born 1850)
 October 23 – Olympia Brown, suffragette (born 1835)
 October 24 – Charles Marion Russell, "cowboy artist" (born 1864)
 October 31 – Harry Houdini, illusionist and stunt performer, known for escape acts (born 1874)
 November 3 – Annie Oakley, performance artist (born 1860)
 November 15 – Lafayette Young, U.S. Senator from Iowa from 1910 to 1911 (born 1848)
 December 10 – Peter Remondino, Italian-born physician, author, first president of the San Diego Board of Health, co-founder of San Diego's first private hospital (born 1846)
 December 31 – Henry A. du Pont, U.S. Senator from Delaware from 1906 to 1917 (born 1838)

See also
 1926 in American television
 List of American films of 1926
 Timeline of United States history (1900–1929)

References

External links
 

 
1920s in the United States
United States
United States
Years of the 20th century in the United States